Calling All Police Cars (literally "...To All the Police Cars") is a 1975 Italian giallo/poliziottesco film. It stars Antonio Sabàto, Gabrielle Ferzetti and Enrico Maria Salerno. The film is very graphic for its time, with excessive gore and nudity.  The screenplay was based on a novel called Violenza a Roma by Massimo Felisatti.

Plot
Rome, Italy mid '70s. The sixteen-year-old daughter of a famous Roman surgeon is found dead in Lake Albano. The police suspect a pervert named Enrico Tummoli. After following one of the girl's classmates named Carla, the police discover an underage sex trafficking ring led by Dutchman Franz Hekker and an ex-government official. The gynecologist who was performing abortions for Hekker winds up dead with his throat slashed. Next Carla is murdered, as well as the pervert Tummoli who was blackmailing the murderer.

Cast
Antonio Sabàto: Fernando Solmi
Enrico Maria Salerno: Carraro
Gabriele Ferzetti: Professor Icardi
Elio Zamuto: Professor Giacometti
Ettore Manni: Enrico Tummoli
Luciana Paluzzi: Giovanna Nunziante
Bedy Moratti: Signora Icardi
Gloria Piedimonte: Carla
Adriana Falco: Fiorella
Tino Bianchi: Commissario
Margherita Horowitz: Antonietta
Franco Ressel: the gynecologist
Andrea Lala: Attardi
Marino Masé: Franz Pagano
Ida Di Benedetto: una signora alla villa
Ilona Staller: una prostituta alla villa

References

External links
 
1975 films
1970s Italian-language films
Poliziotteschi films
1975 crime films
Films scored by Lallo Gori
1970s Italian films